

Army & Marine Corps

Rifles & SMG
 Daewoo K1A Assault Carbine
 Daewoo K2 Assault Rifle
 Daewoo K7 Silencer-Mounted SMG
 Daewoo K11 Advanced Assault Rifle and Air-Burst Smart Grenade Launcher
 Heckler & Koch MP5
 Heckler & Koch HK416
 Colt M4A1
 Colt M16A1 (in use with reserve forces)
 MAC-11

Pistols
 Daewoo K5 
 IMI Jericho 941F Tactical
 Heckler & Koch USP9 Tactical
 Beretta 92FS
 Glock 17

Shotguns
 Remington 870
 Daewoo USAS-12
 Mossberg 500
 Benelli M4 Super 90

Machine guns/Support weapons
 Daewoo K3 Light Machine Gun
 Daewoo K4 40mm Automatic Grenade Launcher
 Daewoo K11 Advanced Assault Rifle and Air-Burst Smart Grenade Launcher
 S&T Daewoo K12 General-Purpose Machine Gun
 S&T Daewoo K6 Heavy Machine Gun
 M60D General-Purpose Machine Gun

Sniper rifles
 Heckler & Koch PSG-1
 Heckler & Koch MSG-90
 Steyr SSG 69
 SIG Sauer SSG 3000
 Accuracy International AWM
 S&T Daewoo K14

Anti-tank munitions
 BGM-71 TOW
 Panzerfaust 3
 AT-13 Metis-M
 M72 LAW
 M40 106mm recoilless rifle
 KSTAM

Tanks
 M48A3K & M48A5K Patton MBTs
 K1(K1E1) & K1A1(K1A2) MBTs
 K2 Black Panther MBT
 T-80U & T-80UK

Armored vehicles
 M113
 K200 & K200A1 series
 BMP-3
 K532
 KM900
 Doosan Barracuda
 K21 KNIFV
 KAAV7A1
 K808(8X8) & K806(6X6) wheeled armored vehicle in 2016

Artillery
 M101 105mm Howitzer
 KH178 105mm Howitzer
 KH179 155mm Howitzer
 M114 155mm Howitzer
 M115 203mm Howitzer
 M107 175mm SP Howitzer
 M110 203mm SP Howitzer
 K55 155mm SP Howitzer
 K9 Thunder 155mm SP Howitzer
 K10 Artillery Munitions Carrier
 M270A1 MLRS
 K-136 Kooryong MRLS

Surface-to-Surface Missile
 Hyunmoo Hyunmoo I SSM(185 km ~ 250 km) / Hyunmoo II SSM(300 km ~ 500 km) / Hyunmoo III SLCM(1000 km ~ 1500 km)
 ATACMS

Self-propelled anti-aircraft vehicles
 K30 Biho SPAAG
 K263A1
The K-SAM Pegasus is categorized under "Missile"

Aviation
 AH-64E
 AH-1S
 AH-1F
 CH-47D
 UH-60P
 UH-1
 Hughes 500MD
 Bo 105
 Surion

Unmanned aerial vehicle (UAV)
 IAI Searcher
 KAI Duck Hawk (KRQ-101 Night Intruder 300)
 KAI Kus-9
 IAI Heron-1

Support vehicles
 KM451 Ambulance Vehicle
 KM450 Utility Truck
 DoDaam Aegis Robot
 RXV Unmanned Vehicle
 KM131 Jeep
 KM250 Cargo Truck
 KM1500 heavy truck

Navy

Rifles & SMGs
 Heckler & Koch HK416
 Heckler & Koch MP5
 Daewoo K1A
 Daewoo K2

Pistols
 Daewoo K5
 IMI Jericho 941F Tactical
 Beretta 92FS
 Heckler & Koch USP9 Tactical
 SIG Sauer P226

Machine Guns
 Daewoo K3
 Daewoo K6

Sniper Rifles
 KAC SR-25

Submarines
 SX 756 Dolgorae("Dolphin")-class submarine
 KSS-I Changbogo class (U209) submarine
 KSS-II Sohn Won-il class (U214) submarine
 KSS-III

Destroyers
 Gwanggaeto the Great class destroyer (KD-I)
 Chungmugong Yi Sunshin class destroyer (KD-II)
 King Sejong the Great class destroyer (KDX-III)

Frigates
 Ulsan-class frigate
 Inchon class frigate

Corvettes
 Donghae class PCC
 Pohang class PCC

Missile craft
 Pae Ku-52
 Pae Ku-51

Patrol craft
 Sea Dolphin/Kiruki-class
 PKM Chamsuri class
 PK-X Gumdoksuri class

Mine warfare ships
 Wonsan class MLS
 Yang-yang class MSH
 Ganggyeong class MHC
 Geumsan (aka Kum San) class MSC (ex-USN MSC-268 class)
 Nam-yang class MSC (ex-USN MSC-294 class)

Amphibious
 Dokdo class LPH
 Gojoonbong class LST
 LCM
 LCU-72 Mulkae
 LSM-655 Ko Mun
 Hovercraft

Support ships
 Cheonji class AOE (Combat Auxiliary Support Ships)
 Cheonghaejin class ASR (Submarine rescue ship)
 Pyeongtaek class ATS (ex-USN Edenton class)

Aviation
 P-3C
 Bell 206 JetRanger
 Cessna F406
 Hughes 500MD
 Aérospatiale SA 316
 Westland Lynx
 Super Lynx Mk.99
 UH-60
 RC-800

Anti-ship/Cruise missiles
 Sea Skua
 SSM-700K Sea Star (Hae Sung)
 AGM-119 Penguin
 Harpoon, Harpoon Block II
 MM38 Exocet

Land Attack Cruise missile
 Hyunmoo III

Ship-to-Air Missile
 RIM-7 Sea Sparrow
 RIM-116 RAM
 RIM-66 Standard

Torpedo/Anti-submarine
 Hong Sang Eo (Red Shark) rocket-based torpedo (K-ASROC)
 K745 LW Blue Shark torpedo
 K731 HW White Shark torpedo
 Mark 46 torpedo
 SUT

Air Force

Fighter aircraft
 F-4D/E Phantom II
 F-5E/F Tiger II
 F-16C/D & KF-16C/D
 F-15K Slam Eagle
 FA-50 Golden Eagle
 A-37B
 KFX (In Development)

Support aircraft
 C-130 Hercules
 CN-235
 BAe 748
 Boeing 737-3Z8
 Hawker 800XP

Trainers
 KT-1
 T-50 Golden Eagle
 Bae Hawk 67MK
 KO-1

Helicopters
 UH-1H
 CH-47D
 AH-1
 Aérospatiale AS 332
 VH/HH-60
 Ka-32
 Surion
 Korean Multi-purpose Helicopter ("KMH") (in development)
 Bell 427 Helicopter (Co-developed by KAI and Bell)
 AH-64 Apache

Unmanned aerial vehicle (UAV)
 IAI Harpy

Special Forces Small Arms

Rifles and Carbines

 Heckler & Koch HK416 (In use mainly with the UDT/SEALs)
 Colt M4A1
 Daewoo K1
 Daewoo K2 (K2C carbine ready for distribution and is in field testing)
 Daewoo K11
 FN SCAR-L

SMGs
 Daewoo K-7
 Heckler & Koch MP5 (MP5SD, MP5N, MP5A2)
 Heckler & Koch MP7 (In use with 707 Special Mission Battalion)
 Brügger & Thomet MP9 (In use with 707 Special Mission Battalion)

Pistols
 Heckler & Koch USP (In .45 ACP)
 Daewoo K5 (Standard sidearm)
 Beretta 92FS
 IMI Jericho 941F Tactical
 Sig Sauer P226 (in use mainly with the Navy)
 Various revolvers (in use mainly with JSA personnel)
 M1911A1

Sniper Rifles
 Heckler & Koch MSG-90
 Heckler & Koch PSG-1
 Steyr SSG 69
 SIG Sauer SSG 3000
 Accuracy International Arctic Warfare Magnum
 S&T Daewoo K14
 KAC SR-25

Missile

Anti-air systems
 M167 Vulcan
 GDF-001 35mm AAA
 K-SAM Pegasus
 MIM-14 Nike-Hercules
 MIM-104C PAC-2, 3
 Javelin
 MIM-23 Hawk
 FIM-92A Stinger ATAS
 Mistral
 KP-SAM Shingung
 SA-16 Igla
 SA-18 Grouse
 RIM-7 Sea Sparrow
 KM-SAM
 RIM-116 RAM
 RIM-66 Standard SM-2
 K-SAAM

Ballistic missiles
 Baekgom
 Hyunmoo-1, 2, 4
 Honest John
 ATACMS

Surface attack munitions
 AGM-65 Maverick
 AGM-88 HARM
 AGM-84K SLAM-ER
 AGM-142 Have Nap
 JDAM
 KEPD 350
 AGM-130
 Mark 84
 Paveway(All variants)
 CBU-58
 CBU-87
 CBU-97
 LAU-3
 LAU-68
 Hyunmoo-3

Air-to-air munitions
 AIM-120 AMRAAM
 AIM-9
 AIM-7

See also 
 Military of South Korea
 Republic of Korea Air Force
 Republic of Korea Army Special Warfare Command
 707th Special Mission Unit

References

 
South Korea
Military equipment